Senator Folsom may refer to:

George Folsom (1802–1869), New York State Senate
W.H.C. Folsom (1817–1900), Minnesota State Senate